The Hotel Ramapo, now known as Taft Hotel, was previously known as Nortonia Hotel, Danmoore Hotel, and (erroneously) Franklin Hotel.  It is a historic residential hotel in Portland, Oregon, United States.  Built in 1906, it is listed on the National Register of Historic Places.

Designed as a residential hotel by Edgar M. Lazarus in 1906, the building was owned by Lazarus until his death in 1939. He first leased it to Mrs. A. B. Norton, and  the hotel's first name was Nortonia Hotel.  Mrs. Norton gave up her lease and used the name Nortonia for the next hotel she managed, now known as the Mark Spencer Hotel.  In 1908, Lazarus leased the building to Dan Moore, who renamed the structure the Danmoore Hotel. Moore closed the hotel in 1909 when he could not make rent payments.  Lazarus, refurnished the building and in June 1909 reopened it with the name Hotel Ramapo, with M. E. Foley as proprietor.  In 1955, the Ramapo Hotel became the Taft Hotel, and the name Taft has been employed in the building's subsequent uses.  The building is now the Taft Home, a facility for senior and disabled adults.

Franklin Hotel was the erroneous historic name assigned to the building when it was listed on the National Register of Historic Places in 1985. The actual Franklin Hotel, located at 515 SW 13th Avenue, was built in 1907. How the author of the National Register nomination confused, by name, the Franklin Hotel (1907) with the historic Hotel Ramapo designed by Lazarus is not clear. The original National Register nomination makes no reference to Hotel Ramapo, the name by which the building was known for almost fifty years. The historic name was corrected on the National Register in January 2013.

See also
National Register of Historic Places listings in Southwest Portland, Oregon

References

1906 establishments in Oregon
Apartment buildings on the National Register of Historic Places in Portland, Oregon
Edgar M. Lazarus buildings
Hotel buildings completed in 1906
Hotel buildings on the National Register of Historic Places in Portland, Oregon
Portland Historic Landmarks
Southwest Portland, Oregon